The crested caracara (Caracara plancus) is a bird of prey in the family Falconidae. It is found from the southern United States through Central and South America to Tierra del Fuego. It was formerly placed in the genus Polyborus.

Description
Individuals from the colder southern part of its range average larger than those from tropical regions (as predicted by Bergmann's rule) and are the largest type of caracara. In fact, they are the second-largest species of falcon in the world by mean body mass, second only to the gyrfalcon. The cap, belly, thighs, most of the wings, and tail tip are dark brownish, the auriculars (feathers surrounding the ear), throat, and nape are whitish-buff, and the chest, neck, mantle, back, upper tail coverts, crissum (the undertail coverts surrounding the cloaca), and basal part of the tail are whitish-buff barred dark brownish. In flight, the outer primaries show a large conspicuous whitish-buff patch ('window'), as in several other species of caracaras. The legs are yellow and the bare facial skin and cere are deep yellow to reddish-orange. Juveniles resemble adults, but are paler, with streaking on the chest, neck, and back, grey legs, and whitish, later pinkish-purple, facial skin and cere.

Behavior
A bold, opportunistic raptor, the crested caracara is often seen walking around on the ground looking for food. It mainly feeds on carcasses of dead animals, but steals food from other raptors, raids bird and reptile nests, and takes live prey if the possibility arises (mostly insects or other small prey [such as small mammals, small birds, amphibians, reptiles, fish, crabs, other shellfish, maggots, and worms], but at least up to the size of a snowy egret). It may also eat fruit. It is dominant over the black and turkey vulture at carcasses. It also pirates food from them and from buteos, as well as from brown pelicans, ibises, and spoonbills, chasing and harrying until they regurgitate or drop food. The crested caracara takes live prey that has been flushed by wildfire, cattle, and farming equipment. Locally, it has even learnt to
follow trains or cars for food thrown out. The opportunistic nature of this species means that the crested caracara seeks out the phenomena associated with its food, e.g. wildfires and circling vultures. It is typically solitary, but several individuals may gather at a large food source (e.g. dumps). Breeding takes place in the Southern Hemisphere spring/summer in the southern part of its range, but timing is less strict in warmer regions. The nest is a large, open structure, typically placed on the top of a tree or palm, but sometimes on the ground. The typical clutch size is two eggs.

Distribution and habitat
The crested caracara occurs from Tierra del Fuego in southernmost South America to the southern United States, Mexico, and Central America. An isolated population occurs on the Falkland Islands. It avoids the Andean highlands and dense humid forest, such as the Amazon rainforest, where it is largely restricted to relatively open sections along major rivers. Otherwise, it occurs in virtually any open or semi-open habitat and is often found near humans.

Reports have been made of the crested caracara as far north as San Francisco, California. and, in 2012, near Crescent City, California. Some are believed to possibly be living in Nova Scotia, with numerous sightings throughout the 2010s. In July 2016 a northern caracara was reported and photographed by numerous people in the upper peninsula of Michigan, just outside of Munising. In June 2017, a northern caracara was sighted far north in St. George, New Brunswick, Canada. A specimen was photographed in Woodstock, Vermont in March 2020. The species has recently become more common in central and north Texas and is generally common in south Texas and south of the US border. It can also be found (nesting) in the Southern Caribbean (e.g. Aruba, Curaçao and Bonaire), Mexico, and Central America.

Florida caracara
Florida is home to a relict population of northern caracaras that dates to the last glacial period, which ended around 12,500 BP. At that time, Florida and the rest of the Gulf Coast were covered in an oak savanna. As temperatures increased, the savanna between Florida and Texas disappeared. Caracaras were able to survive in the prairies of central Florida and the marshes along the St. Johns River. Cabbage palmettos are a preferred nesting site, although they also nest in southern live oaks. Their historical range on the modern-day Florida peninsula included Okeechobee, Osceola, Highlands, Glades, Polk, Indian River, St. Lucie, Hardee, DeSoto, Brevard, Collier, and Martin counties. They are currently most common in DeSoto, Glades, Hendry, Highlands, Okeechobee, and Osceola Counties. It has been seen on the East Coast as far as extreme eastern Seminole County, Florida (Lake Harney), where it is now considered a resident, but listed as threatened. In February 2023 a crested caracara was identified in St, Johns County, Florida and documented by The St. Johns County Audubon Society on their social media page.

Crested caracara in Mexico
Mexican ornithologist Rafael Martín del Campo proposed that the northern caracara was possibly the sacred "eagle" depicted in several pre-Columbian Aztec codices, as well as the Florentine Codex. This imagery was adopted as a national symbol of Mexico, but it is not the bird depicted on the flag, which is a golden eagle (Aquila chrysaetos), the national bird.

Texan eagle
Balduin Möllhausen, the German artist accompanying the 1853 railroad survey (led by Lt. Amiel Weeks Whipple) from the Canadian River to California along the 35th parallel, recounted observing what he called the "Texan Eagle", which, in his account, he identified as Audubon's Polyborus vulgaris. This sighting occurred in the Sans Bois Mountains in southeastern Oklahoma. Many Texans incorrectly refer to the caracara as the “Mexican eagle”.

Status
Throughout most of its range, its occurrence is common to very common. It is likely to benefit from the widespread deforestation in tropical South America, so is considered to be of least concern by BirdLife International.

References

Further reading
 Dove, C. & R. Banks. 1999. A Taxonomic study of Crested Caracaras (Falconidae). Wilson Bull. 111(3): 330–339. Available online (PDF) 
 Ferguson-Lees, J., D. Christie, P. Burton, K. Franklin & D. Mead (2001). Raptors of the World. Christopher Helm. 
 Restall, R., C. Rodner, & M. Lentino (2006). Birds of Northern South America. Vol. 1 & 2. Helm, London.  (vol. 1);  (vol. 2)
 Schulenberg, T., D. Stotz, D. Lane, J. O'Neill, & T. Parker III (2007). Birds of Peru. Helm, London.

External links

 Photos and text – arthurgrosset.com
 Photos and text – faunaparaguay.com

crested caracara
crested caracara
Birds of Argentina
Birds of Chile
Birds of Brazil
Birds of Bolivia
Birds of Paraguay
Birds of Uruguay
Native birds of the Southeastern United States
Native birds of the Southwestern United States
Birds of Cuba
Birds of Central America
Birds of the Caribbean
crested caracara
crested caracara

zh:鳳頭卡拉鷹